La Rochebeaucourt-et-Argentine is a commune in the Dordogne department in Nouvelle-Aquitaine in southwestern France.

Geography
The Lizonne (locally called Nizonne) forms the commune's northwestern border.

Population

See also
Communes of the Dordogne department

References

Communes of Dordogne